The Umatilla Indian Reservation is an Indian reservation in the Pacific Northwest of the United States. It was created by The Treaty of June 9, 1855 between the United States and members of the Walla, Cayuse, and Umatilla tribes. It lies in northeastern Oregon, east of Pendleton. The reservation is mostly in Umatilla County, with a very small part extending south into Union County. It is managed by the three Confederated Tribes of the Umatilla Indian Reservation.

Located on the north side of the Blue Mountains, the reservation was established for two Sahaptin-speaking Native American tribes: the Umatilla and Walla Walla, and for the Cayuse, whose language, now extinct, was an isolate. All the tribes historically inhabited the Columbia Plateau region. The tribes share land and a governmental structure as part of their confederation.

Geography, demographics and headquarters

In addition, some 300 Native Americans from other regional tribes and 1,500 non-natives live on the reservation. The largest community is Mission, which is the site of the tribal headquarters as well as the Umatilla Agency of the Bureau of Indian Affairs. Some BIA agency offices serve more than one federally recognized tribe, but the Umatilla Agency exclusively serves the Confederated Tribes of the Umatilla Indian Reservation (CTUIR).

History
The tribes developed the Wildhorse Casino Resort on their reservation to generate revenues for their people. The casino is located near Interstate 84. In 2006 it started Cayuse Technologies, to provide software development and related services. These enterprises employ 1,000 persons and have markedly reduced unemployment.

Pendleton photographer Walter S. Bowman photographed tribe members in the early 20th century. The CTUIR founded the Tamástslikt Cultural Institute, a museum that provides both historical and contemporary exhibits related to the confederated tribes, as well as exhibits of contemporary Native American arts and traditional craftwork.

Communities

Cayuse
Gibbon
Gopher Flats
Kirkpatrick
Mission
Riverside
Tutuilla

See also 
Henry Roe Cloud, Superintendent, Umatilla Indian Reservation
Shoni Schimmel, WNBA player born and raised on the reservation until leaving with her family while in high school

References

External links
Umatilla Reservation, Oregon United States Census Bureau
Historical National Park Service photos from Umatilla Indian Reservation
A middle-aged man reflects on his life at the Umatilla reservation

American Indian reservations in Oregon
Geography of Umatilla County, Oregon
Geography of Union County, Oregon